George Wayne Goodwin (born February 22, 1967) is an American politician. He was elected North Carolina Commissioner of Insurance in the 2008 election and re-elected in 2012. He was narrowly defeated in his bid for a third term in 2016. However, he quickly rebounded and was elected on February 11, 2017, as chairman of the North Carolina Democratic Party on the first ballot with 92% of the vote among four candidates.

Goodwin previously served as a Democratic member of the North Carolina General Assembly representing the state's sixty-eighth House district, including constituents in Richmond and Stanly counties. His prior district – the 32nd House district – also included Scotland and Montgomery Counties.

Political career
After serving as President of the Young Democrats of North Carolina, Goodwin served four full terms in the North Carolina state House. Goodwin campaigned as the Democratic nominee for the position of North Carolina Commissioner of Labor in the 2004 election, losing in a close race to incumbent Republican Cherie Berry.

Goodwin served as the Assistant Commissioner of Insurance and Assistant State Fire Marshal for the State of North Carolina from 2005 through 2008. In 2008, Goodwin filed to run for Commissioner of Insurance after the surprise retirement of longtime Commissioner Jim Long. Goodwin defeated David Smith in the Democratic primary 56%–43% and went on to beat Republican John Odom and Libertarian Mark McMains with 51.57% of the vote. He was sworn-in on January 10, 2009. Goodwin won re-election in the 2012 general contest by almost four percentage points.

He was a candidate for re-election in 2016. After very narrowly losing the general election, Goodwin announced that he would run for chairman of the North Carolina Democratic Party. With the support of 92% of ballots cast, he was elected to lead the state party on Feb. 11, 2017.  Two years later, in January 2019, Goodwin won unanimous re-election to a second term as chairman of the North Carolina Democratic Party. After completing a customary second term, Goodwin chose to refrain from a third term soon after his wife died from cancer and he had two children to raise. His first vice chair, Bobbie Richardson, succeeded Goodwin as party chair.

He unsuccessfully sought a third (non-consecutive) term as insurance commissioner in the 2020 election.

In 2022, Goodwin was appointed commissioner of the North Carolina Division of Motor Vehicles. As commissioner, he lifted various restrictions for LGBT speech on vanity plates. Previously, vanity plates with LGBT content were not permitted by the Division. Under the direction of Goodwin, the DMV cracked down on racist and antisemitic vanity plates that had been approved due to creative spelling used to get around DMV restrictions.

Personal life
Goodwin was a Morehead Scholar and US Senate/William Randolph Hearst Scholar. He graduated from the University of North Carolina at Chapel Hill in political science and then went on to graduate from the UNC School of Law. He was married to Melanie Wade Goodwin, also a former state legislator and attorney, until her death at age 50 in 2020. They are the parents of two children.

Electoral history

References

External links 
Wayne Goodwin campaign site
Wayne's World

|-

|-

|-

1967 births
21st-century American politicians
Living people
Democratic Party members of the North Carolina House of Representatives
North Carolina Commissioners of Insurance
North Carolina Democratic Party chairs
North Carolina lawyers
People from Hamlet, North Carolina
People from Rockingham, North Carolina
University of North Carolina School of Law alumni